Kebon Kacang is an administrative village in Tanah Abang, Central Jakarta, Indonesia. It has postal code of 10240.

See also 
 Tanah Abang
 List of administrative villages of Jakarta

Administrative villages in Jakarta